Muhammad Tatar Khan was the Sultan of North Bengal during 1259-1268 CE after usurping the Governorship of Ijjauddin Balban Iuzbaki.

History
In 1258 CE, Tatar Khan defeated Izzuddin Balban, later building a tomb for his predecessor in 1261.

After the Sultan of Delhi, Nasiruddin refused to sanction his Campaigns against the Eastern Ganga dynasty who held South Bengal, Tartar Khan declared independence from Delhi until 1266 when he sent his envoys to Sultan Ghiyasuddin Balban. This diplomatic mission from Bengal was accorded a royal reception at Delhi worthy of embassies from Iran or Turan. The envoys of Tatar Khan were loaded with valuable gifts and given leave of departure as well as official sanction for Military campaigns in South Bengal.

However Muhammad Tatar Khan died before the Envoys returned, two years after Balban's accession.

Sources

Governors of Bengal
13th-century Indian Muslims
13th-century Indian monarchs